Benyamin Naeem Habib (born 7 June 1965) is a British businessman and former politician. He was elected as a Brexit Party Member of the European Parliament (MEP) in the 2019 European parliamentary election. He remained in the role until the United Kingdom's withdrawal from the EU. Habib is the chief executive of First Property Group, a commercial property investment and fund management company.

Early life, education and career
Benyamin Naeem Habib was born on 7 June 1965 in Karachi, Sindh, Pakistan. His father is Pakistani, as is he. He moved to the UK in 1979 and his early education was at the private Rugby School. Habib is a former president of its alumni association, the Rugbeian Society. He then attended Robinson College, Cambridge, where he studied natural sciences. After graduating, Habib became an analyst in the corporate finance department at former financial services firm Lehman Brothers. After this, he was appointed finance director at insurance broker PWS Holdings.

In 1994, Habib entered the properties business as the managing director of private property development company, JKL Property, before starting his own property fund company First Property Group plc six years later. The company, for which he is the chief executive, operates in the UK, Poland, and Romania.

Political career
Habib was  a Conservative Party voter and donor. He supported Brexit in the 2016 referendum and argued the UK's trade opportunities would be better outside of the European Union (EU), that being part of the EU meant that the UK had ceded sovereignty, and that there needed to be greater control of immigration. He had also discussed in interviews how uncertainty around Brexit could be an opportunity for profit for his business.

In the 2019 European parliamentary election, Habib stood as a candidate for the Brexit Party in the London constituency. He was first on his party's list, and was elected as one of its two MEPs in the constituency. He was a member of the Committee on Economic and Monetary Affairs, and part of the delegation for relations with the countries of South Asia. According to Transparency International, Habib was the richest MEP elected in the Ninth European Parliament based on annual earnings from his second job. He declared €960,000 annual earnings from his company, First Property Group.

On 29 January 2020, Ben Habib voted in favour of the Brexit withdrawal agreement, which included the Northern Ireland Protocol, being ratified by the EU Parliament. Habib had previously indicated he would do so in part because of the Conservative Party 2019 United Kingdom general election victory giving them a clear democratic mandate to deliver the Withdrawal Agreement, which was one of their election manifesto pledges.

On 22 February 2020, Ben Habib published an article on the Brexit-Watch.org website where he described the Protocol, despite its obvious impingement on UK sovereignty, as a being a unique advantage to Northern Ireland business that would help the province grow into a tiger economy. He also recommended Unionists should not resist its implementation and instead "make it work for its own great benefit and that of the United Kingdom".

Legal challenge against the Northern Ireland Protocol
On 19 February 2021, Habib together with Jim Allister, leader of the Traditional Unionist Voice, and Baroness Hoey, applied for leave for a judicial review of the Northern Ireland Protocol, part of the Brexit withdrawal agreement. They were later joined in their litigation by Arlene Foster, First Minister of Northern Ireland, David Trimble, Belfast Agreement architect; and Steve Aiken, leader of the Ulster Unionist Party. The main cause of the legal action was to examine the lawfulness and constitutionality of the Northern Ireland Protocol, in regards to their claimed incompatibility of the Protocol and related regulations with the Acts of Union 1800.

On 30 June 2021, the High Court of Northern Ireland in Belfast dismissed the legal challenge  on several grounds, including that it is in conflict with the Acts of Union 1800 and thus unconstitutional. The Hight Court ruled that the Protocol indeed runs counter to the free trade provisions of the Acts (Article VI), but the European Union (Withdrawal Agreement) Act 2020 also has constitutional effect and had implicitly repealed that aspect of the Acts of Union. The court also rejected arguments based on the Northern Ireland Act, the European Convention on Human Rights and European Union law. Likewise, the court rejected a challenge to the Regulations, which provided that the consent mechanism in the Protocol was not to be subject to the cross-community voting rules in the Assembly.

On 14 March 2022, that decision was affirmed by the Northern Ireland Court of Appeal, with the judgment making reference to the "obvious inconsistency" of Habib first voting in favour of the Withdrawal
Agreement and Northern Ireland Protocol, as stated in paragraph 11 of his sworn affidavit, but then subsequently calling for a repudiation.

On 30 November 2022, the legal challenge was brought before the Supreme Court of the United Kingdom , with a final decision on the legal challenge due in February 2023.

On 8 February 2023, the Supreme Court dismissed the challenge but did confirm that Article 6 of the Acts of Union had been subjugated by the Northern Ireland Protocol and cross community consent, as required by the Good Friday Agreement, had been disapplied in its application.

References

External links 
 European Parliament Page 

1965 births
Living people
People educated at Rugby School
Alumni of Robinson College, Cambridge
Brexit Party MEPs
MEPs for England 2019–2020
British politicians of Pakistani descent
Pakistani emigrants to the United Kingdom
Politicians from London